Cherry Hill Historic District is an official historic district in the southeast corridor of Grand Rapids, Michigan.   The district was formed by local residents who wanted to reduce crime and increase individual home ownership.

Cherry Hill  consists of James Street, Charles Street, Henry street, the west side of Eastern between Cherry and Wealthy, the north side of Wealthy between Eastern and Union, Cherry Street between Union and Eastern, and part of Packard Street.

Cherry Hill was historically designated in 1994. The exteriors of homes  in the district are reviewed by the Grand Rapids Historic Preservation Commission to maintain historical accuracy.

Businesses within Cherry Hill include Cherry Hill Market, Donkey Taqueria, and Elk Brewing, and Cherry Park falls within the boundaries of this neighborhood.

History 
In the early 1990s, many properties in the Cherry Hill area were owned by absentee landlords and were in poor repair. Crime, drug trafficking and gang activity were also present. 

After two gang attacks on residents,  20 neighbors held a meeting decided to revive the old JHCCO Block Club. At a second meeting, the group decided to call itself "Cherry Hill".

The Cherry Hill Market opened in December, 1991.  During this 1991-1994 period, Cherry Hill community organizers started a series of home ownership seminars.   In 1992, these were supplemented by "Practical Preservation Workshops" that showed home owners how to rehab their properties.

Neighborhoods in Grand Rapids, Michigan